Hales is a small village in Norfolk, England.

History
The villages name means 'Nooks of land'.

The manor of Hales dates back to the Domesday book. From the 11th century to the 17th century, Hales manor was held by the De Hales, later Hales, family. 
Hales Hall was built in 1478 by Sir James Hobart, the Attorney General to Henry VII. He acquired the estate from Sir Roger de Hales whose daughter had married the Duke of Norfolk.  In 1666, the last Hales heiress was Lady Dionysia Williamson, who left her estate to her nephew John Hoskins.

Church of St Margaret

The Church of Hales St Margaret is one of 124 existing round-tower churches in Norfolk. With its thatched roof, this church probably comes closest to the original appearance of an early round-tower church. It is in care of the Churches Conservation Trust, and is a Grade I listed building.

Transport
The X2 bus service goes from Norwich in the west to Lowestoft in the east.

Amenities
The Pastures is a care home on Yarmouth Road.

Nearest places
Loddon
Thurton
Thurlton
Raveningham

See also
 Clavering hundred

References 

http://kepn.nottingham.ac.uk/map/place/Norfolk/Hales

External links

St Margaret's on the European Round Tower Churches Website
Photos from Geograph

Villages in Norfolk
Civil parishes in Norfolk